The Opata sucker, or matalote Opata (Catostomus wigginsi), is a species of ray-finned fish in the family Catostomidae. It is found only in Mexico.

References

Sources 
 

Opata sucker
Endemic fish of Mexico
Freshwater fish of Mexico
Endangered biota of Mexico
Taxonomy articles created by Polbot
Fish described in 1936